Ryan Leonard Lalisang (born 21 August 1980 in Balikpapan, Kalimantan Timur) is an Indonesian ten-pin bowler.

Career 

Ryan Leonard Lalisang finished 11th position of the combined rankings at the 2006 AMF Bowling World Cup, Caracas, Venezuela. He won the gold medal in Sea Games 2005 in Manila, Asian Bowling Championships 2006 and Asian Games 2006 Doha, Qatar for the Indonesian bowling national team. He won Kuwait open 2007 Kuwait. He got bronze on men's double in Asian Indoor and Martial Arts Games in 2009, Vietnam. He finished 3rd position at the 2009 AMF Bowling World Cup  Malacca, Malaysia. He got 5 Gold medals at PON KALTIM 2008,Samarinda. He is now #1 Bowler in Indonesia for 10 times.

References 

Living people
1980 births
Indonesian Christians
Indonesian ten-pin bowling players
People from Balikpapan
Sportspeople from East Kalimantan
Asian Games medalists in bowling
Bowlers at the 2006 Asian Games
Bowlers at the 2010 Asian Games
Bowlers at the 2014 Asian Games
Bowlers at the 2018 Asian Games
Asian Games gold medalists for Indonesia
Medalists at the 2006 Asian Games
Southeast Asian Games gold medalists for Indonesia
Southeast Asian Games silver medalists for Indonesia
Southeast Asian Games bronze medalists for Indonesia
Southeast Asian Games medalists in bowling
Competitors at the 2005 Southeast Asian Games
Competitors at the 2017 Southeast Asian Games
Competitors at the 2019 Southeast Asian Games
Competitors at the 2021 Southeast Asian Games
21st-century Indonesian people